Francisco Javier Lara Arano (born 9 June 1959) is a Mexican politician affiliated with the National Action Party. As of 2014 he served as Deputy of the LIX Legislature of the Mexican Congress as a plurinominal representative.

References

1959 births
Living people
Politicians from Veracruz
Members of the Chamber of Deputies (Mexico)
National Action Party (Mexico) politicians
Members of the Congress of Veracruz
20th-century Mexican politicians
21st-century Mexican politicians
Universidad Veracruzana alumni
Deputies of the LIX Legislature of Mexico